M. S. Mani (1926–2008) was an Indian film director and film editor of Malayalam movies. He won National award twice in 1990 and 1992 for editing the films Nakhashatangal and Iyyer The Great and Kerala State Award in 1972 for editing. He joined the film industry in 1948 and his first film was Ashaadeepam. He has edited more than 300 movies. His famous works as editor includes Kathapurushan, Vidheyan, Sargam, Oru Vadakkan Veeragatha, Anantharam and Amritham Gamaya all that went noticed at the national level. He also edited many Hindi and Tamil films. He also directed seven films, including Doctor, Sathyabhama, Subaida, Thalirukal, Vilakkapatta Bandhangal and Jalakannyaka. He was a popular Malayalam movie director during 1980s.

Personal life
He hails from Poojapura in Thiruvananthapuram. He was born in November 1926 to Mrithyunjaya Ayyar and Balambal. He died on 9 March 2008 at the Sree Ramachandra Hospital in Chennai, following heart diseases. He was 81 and is survived by wife Seethamani and only son, Karthik.

Awards
National Film Awards
 1990 – National Film Award for Best Editing for Iyer the Great
 1992 – National Film Award for Best Editing for Sargam

Kerala State Film Awards
 1972 – Kerala State Film Award for Best Editor for Maram

Partial filmography

Editor
 Aashadeepam (1953)
 Snehaseema (1954)
 Koodappirappu (1956)
 Nairu Pidicha Pulivaalu (1958)
 Chathurangam (1959)
 Jnaanasundari (1961)
 Viyarppinte Vila (1962)
 Puthiya Aakaasham Puthiya Bhoomi (1962)
 Doctor (1963)
 Sathyabhaama (1963)
 Oru Vadakkan Veeragatha 91989)
 Panjagni (1986)
 Nakhashathangal (1996)
 O Faby (1992)
 Evideyo Oru Shathru (1983)
 Varanmaare Aavashyamundu (1983)
 Poomadathe Pennu	(1984)
 Vellam (1984)
 Vikatakavi (1984)	
 Anjaam Hindi (1986)
 Amrutham Gamaya (1987)
 Mangai Oru Gangai (Tamil) (1987)
 Aranyakam (1988)
 Oliyambukal (1990)
 Pavakoothu (1990)
 Sargam (1992)
 Parinayam (1994)
 Ennu Swantham Janakikutty (1998)
 Prem Poojari (1999)

Direction
 Puthiya Aakaasham Puthiya Bhoomi (1962)
 Doctor (1963)
 Sathyabhaama (1963)
 Subaida (1965)
 Thalirukal (1967)
 Vilakkappetta Bandhangal (1969)
 Jalakanyaka (1971)

References

External links

1926 births
2008 deaths
Malayalam film directors
Malayalam film editors
Best Editor National Film Award winners
Film directors from Thiruvananthapuram
Kerala State Film Award winners
Film editors from Kerala
20th-century Indian film directors